Joëlle Stephanie Békhazi (born April 27, 1987) is a female water polo player from Canada. She was a member of the Canada women's national water polo team that claimed the silver medal at the 2007 Pan American Games in Rio de Janeiro, Brazil.

In June 2021, Bekhazi was named to Canada's 2020 Summer Olympics team.

See also
 List of World Aquatics Championships medalists in water polo

References

External links
 
 

1987 births
Living people
Canadian female water polo players
Aquatic sportspeople from Ontario
Olympic water polo players of Canada
Sportspeople from Hamilton, Ontario
Water polo players at the 2007 Pan American Games
Water polo players at the 2011 Pan American Games
World Aquatics Championships medalists in water polo
Pan American Games silver medalists for Canada
Pan American Games medalists in water polo
Water polo players at the 2015 Pan American Games
Water polo players at the 2019 Pan American Games
Medalists at the 2011 Pan American Games
Medalists at the 2019 Pan American Games
Medalists at the 2015 Pan American Games
Water polo players at the 2020 Summer Olympics